Cricket Federation of Uzbekistan (CFU) is the governing body for cricket in Uzbekistan. The Cricket Federation of Uzbekistan was registered on 29 November 2019, by the Ministry of Justice of Uzbekistan. The founder of the Cricket Federation of Uzbekistan is Mr. Aziz Gaybullaevich. Mihliev and he currently acts as a President of the Cricket Federation of Uzbekistan. The formation of the Cricket Federation indicates that Uzbekistan is the second country in Central Asia where cricket was founded.  Cricket is developing at a fast pace in Uzbekistan and the number of cricket athletes is increasing.

History
The "ANFA-Tashkent T20" tournament which took place on 1, 2, 3 November 2020 among local cricket teams became a historical event in the sport of cricket in Uzbekistan. The competition was held together with the leadership of the National Olympic Committee, representatives of the Ministry of Physical Culture and Sports and the Cricket Federation of Uzbekistan. Several media outlets also reported on the event.
Uzbekistan Cricket Federation has signed MOU with Cricket Russia in 2020. 

In March 2021, Uzbekistan announced for the launch of a T20 cricket league that would be played in August.

Administration

President of CFU:
Aziz G. Mihliev

Chief Secretary:
 Jahongir Murodov

Current Head Coaches:
Men's national team:  Vacant
Junior Team's:  Vacant

Marketing Manager:
Abdurahim Ergashev

See also
 Uzbekistan national cricket team

References

External links
 Official Facebook page
 Linkedin Page
  

Cricket administration
Cricket in Uzbekistan
Cricket
Sports organizations established in 2019